The 113 Squadron of the  Israeli Air Force, also known as the Tayeset Ha'Tsira'a (Hornet or Wasp Squadron), was formed on October 4, 1955. The Hornets were the first squadron to fly 24 MD450B Dassault Ouragans. It suffered eight fatalities during the 1967 Six-Day War.

By January 1973 IAI Nesher replaced the Dassault Ouragans that were retired from duty.
In 1976 the squadron replaced the Nesher with the IAI Kfir C-1.
The squadron was disbanded in 1987.

The squadron was reformed in September 1990 as the first Israeli AH-64A Apache squadron and slowly migrated to the exclusive use of the AH-64D Apache Longbow in 2005.

External links
Global Security Profile
113 Squadron on Aeroflight.co.uk.
Squadron 113 "Ha'Tsira'a" The Wasp Squadron 

Israeli Air Force squadrons